The Dreamers is a 2003 romantic drama film directed by Bernardo Bertolucci. The screenplay is by Gilbert Adair, based on his 1988 novel The Holy Innocents. An international co-production by companies from France, the United Kingdom, and Italy, the film tells the story of an American university student in Paris who, after meeting a peculiar brother and sister who are fellow film enthusiasts, becomes entangled in an erotic triangle. It is set against the backdrop of the 1968 Paris student riots. The film makes several references to various movies of classical and French New Wave cinema, incorporating clips from films that are often imitated by the actors in particular scenes.

There are two versions: an uncut NC-17-rated version, and an R-rated version that is about three minutes shorter.

Plot
Matthew is an American exchange student who has come to Paris to study French. While at the Cinémathèque Française protesting the firing of Henri Langlois, he meets the free-spirited twins Théo and Isabelle. The three bond over a shared love of film. 
After dinner with their parents, Théo and Isabelle offer Matthew the chance to stay with them while their parents are on a trip. Matthew accepts, considering them his first French friends.

Matthew becomes suspicious of their relationship after seeing them sleeping nude together; he soon discovers that they accept nudity and sexuality liberally. After Théo loses at a trivia game, Isabelle sentences him to masturbate to a Marlene Dietrich poster in front of them. After Matthew loses at another game, he is seduced to take Isabelle's virginity. The two then become lovers.

Matthew begins to accept Théo and Isabelle's sexuality and his time living with them soon becomes idyllic. The three re-enact a memorable scene from Bande à part by "breaking the world record for running through the Louvre", and Matthew and Théo engage in playful arguments about Charlie Chaplin and Buster Keaton, Eric Clapton and Jimi Hendrix, as well as the subject of Maoism, which Théo fervently believes in.

During this time, Matthew begins to pursue a relationship with Isabelle, separate from Théo. Matthew and Isabelle leave the house and go on a regular date, which she has not experienced before. Théo retaliates by inviting a companion up to his room, upsetting Isabelle. She distances herself from both Théo and Matthew, only to find them next to each other on Théo's bed when an argument between the two turns erotic. She then surprises them with a makeshift bedsheet fort and they fall asleep in each other's arms.

One morning, Théo and Isabelle's parents arrive home and find the trio naked in bed together. They are startled by what they find, but leave them be, departing after leaving a cheque. After they leave, Isabelle wakes up and discovers the cheque, realising that their parents have found them. Wordlessly, she attaches a hose to the gas outlet and lies back down with Théo and Matthew, attempting to commit suicide. After a few moments, however, they are woken by a brick being hurled through the window; they discover hundreds of students rioting in the streets.

All three of them are overjoyed and proceed to join the protesters. Later on, Théo joins a small team of protesters preparing Molotov cocktails. Matthew tries to stop Théo by kissing him and his sister, arguing against violence, but he is shunned by both Théo and Isabelle.

As Matthew walks away through the chaos, Théo takes Isabelle's hand and hurls a Molotov cocktail at a line of police. The police charge the crowd.

Cast

 Michael Pitt as Matthew
 Eva Green as Isabelle
 Louis Garrel as Théo
 Anna Chancellor as Mother
 Robin Renucci as Father
 Jean-Pierre Kalfon as Himself
 Jean-Pierre Léaud as Himself
 Florian Cadiou as Patrick
 Pierre Hancisse as First buff
 Valentin Merlet as Second buff
 Lola Peploe as The Usherette
 Ingy Fillion as Théo's girlfriend

Production
The first draft of the screenplay was an adaptation by Gilbert Adair of his own novel, The Holy Innocents (1988), inspired by the novel Les Enfants terribles (1929) by Jean Cocteau and the eponymous film directed by Jean-Pierre Melville in 1950. During pre-production, Bertolucci made changes to it: he "peppered the narrative with clips from the films he loves" and dropped homosexual content – including scenes from the novel that depict Matthew and Théo having sex – which he felt was "just too much." After the film was released, he said that it was "faithful to the spirit of the book but not the letter."

Eva Green told The Guardian that her agent and her parents begged her not to take the role of Isabelle, concerned that the film – which features full frontal nudity and graphic sex scenes – would cause her career to "have the same destiny as Maria Schneider." Jake Gyllenhaal screen tested for the role of Matthew alongside Green, but eventually removed himself from consideration due to concerns about the film’s nudity. Michael Pitt was cast instead.

When Green saw a rough cut of the film, she said she was "quite shocked" and had to look away during the sex scenes; she later told an interviewer that for her, "it was as though I was wearing a costume while we were making the film. It was as if I had another story in my mind. So I was left speechless."

Rating
Fox Searchlight Pictures gave the uncut version a limited theatrical release in the United States in 2004; it played in 116 theaters at its peak. In the United States, the film was released theatrically with an NC-17 rating whereas in Italy the same film was rated VM14. Even with its NC-17 rating, this film grossed $2.5 million in its United States theatrical release – a respectable result for a specialized film with a targeted audience.

Reception
On review aggregator Rotten Tomatoes, the film has a positive score of 60% based on 161 reviews, with an average rating of 6.18/10. The site's consensus reads, "Though lushly atmospheric, The Dreamers doesn't engage or provoke as much as it should". The 40 reviews gathered by Metacritic gave it an average score of 62/100, which places the film in the website's "generally favorable" category. A.O. Scott of The New York Times said the film was "disarmingly sweet and completely enchanting" and described it as "fus[ing] sexual discovery with political tumult by means of a heady, heedless romanticism that nearly obscures the film's patient, skeptical intelligence". The Times called it a "heady blend of Last Tango and Stealing Beauty, but one that combines the grubbily voyeuristic elements of each film rather than their relative strengths". Roger Ebert gave the film four stars, his highest rating, describing the film as "poignant" and "extraordinarily beautiful".

Music and soundtrack 
The music advisors were Julien Civange and Charles Henri de Pierrefeu. Janice Ginsberg is credited as music supervisor and Nick Laird-Clowes as music consultant. The soundtrack was released in February 2004; Allmusic gave it three out of five, noting that "while its juxtapositions of French tradition and counterculture are jarring at times, Dreamers still does a worthy job of capturing the film's personal and political revolutions through music."

 "Third Stone from the Sun" – Jimi Hendrix
 "Hey Joe" (cover version) – Michael Pitt & The Twins of Evil
 "Quatre Cents Coups" (from the score of "Les Quatre Cents Coups") – Jean Constantin
 "New York Herald Tribune" (from Breathless) – Martial Solal
 "Love Me Please Love Me" – Michel Polnareff
 "La Mer" – Charles Trenet
 "Song For Our Ancestors" – Steve Miller Band
 "The Spy" – The Doors
 "Tous les garçons et les filles" – Françoise Hardy
 "Ferdinand" (from Antoine Duhamel's score of "Pierrot Le Fou")
 "Dark Star" (special band edit) – The Grateful Dead
 "Non, Je Ne Regrette Rien" – Edith Piaf

Though the music of Janis Joplin and Big Brother and the Holding Company was featured prominently in the film, none of the songs were included on the soundtrack. All of the songs used in the film were from the album Live at Winterland '68. Bob Dylan's song "Queen Jane Approximately", from the album Highway 61 Revisited, is also used in the film but is not included on the soundtrack. The Doors song "Maggie M'Gill" can be heard in the movie, but is not included on the soundtrack either.

Home media
The Dreamers was released on DVD in 2004. It includes a BBC film directed by David M. Thompson, Bertolucci Makes The Dreamers, narrated by Zoë Wanamaker, and a documentary Outside the Window: Events in France, May 1968 with contributions from Robin Blackburn, Adair, and Bertolucci. Bertolucci says that 1968 was about cinema, politics, music, journalism, sex and philosophy dreaming together.

See also
 Eros and Civilization
 Y Tu Mamá También

References

External links

2003 films
2000s erotic drama films
French erotic drama films
British erotic drama films
Italian erotic drama films
2000s French-language films
Films directed by Bernardo Bertolucci
Films based on British novels
Films set in 1968
Films set in Paris
Films about threesomes
Films about twins
May 1968 events in France
Films produced by Jeremy Thomas
English-language French films
English-language Italian films
2003 drama films
Twins in fiction
2003 multilingual films
British multilingual films
French multilingual films
Italian multilingual films
2000s British films
2000s French films